The 2022 FIA World Endurance Championship was the tenth season of the FIA World Endurance Championship, an auto racing series organised by the Fédération Internationale de l'Automobile (FIA) and the Automobile Club de l'Ouest (ACO). The series was open to prototype and grand tourer-style racing cars divided into four categories. World Championship titles were awarded to the leading manufacturers and drivers in both the prototype and grand tourer divisions.

It was the first season in which LMDh (Le Mans Daytona h) entries are allowed to compete alongside LMH (Le Mans Hypercar) entries on a race-by-race basis. However, they were not eligible for championship points until 2023. It was the last season for LMGTE Pro class.

Calendar
The provisional calendar was announced in August 2021, featuring six rounds. Sebring and Fuji returned to the schedule after being canceled in 2021, while the second Bahrain and Portimão events were removed from the schedule. The 24 Hours of Le Mans also returned to its traditional early summer date.

Entries

Hypercar

LMP2 

In accordance with the 2017 LMP2 regulations, all cars in the LMP2 class used the Gibson GK428 V8 engine. Entries in the LMP2 Pro-Am Cup, set aside for teams with a Bronze-rated driver in their line-up, are denoted with Icons.

LMGTE Pro

LMGTE Am

Results and standings

Race results 
The highest finishing competitor entered in the World Endurance Championship is listed below. Invitational entries may have finished ahead of WEC competitors in individual races.

Drivers' championships 
Five titles are offered to drivers, two with world championship status. The Hypercar World Endurance Drivers' Championship is reserved for Hypercar drivers while the GTE World Endurance Drivers' Championship is available for drivers in the LMGTE categories. FIA Endurance Trophies are awarded in LMP2, in LMP2 Pro/Am and in LMGTE Am.

Entries were required to complete the timed race as well as to complete 70% of the overall winning car's race distance in order to earn championship points. A single bonus point was awarded to the team and all drivers of the pole position car for each category in qualifying. Furthermore, a race must complete two laps under green flag conditions in order for championship points to be awarded.

Hypercar World Endurance Drivers' Championship

World Endurance GTE Drivers' Championship

FIA Endurance Trophy for LMP2 Drivers